Coronel Altino Machado de Oliveira Airport  is the airport serving the city of Governador Valadares, Brazil.

Airlines and destinations

Access

See also

List of airports in Brazil

References

External links

Airports in Minas Gerais